Broumov Airport (ICAO airport code LKBR) is an airport in Broumov in the Czech Republic.

References

External links 
Broumov Airport
Broumov

Airports in the Czech Republic